Incrustocalyptella is a genus of fungi in the Cyphellaceae family. The genus contains three species collectively distributed in Colombia, Papua New Guinea, the Hawaiian Islands, and Thailand.

References

Cyphellaceae
Agaricales genera